Ma Shouyu (1908 - 1977) was a political figure in the People's Republic of China.

Early life  
Ma was born in Tai'an County, Shandong Province.

Career 
In 1924, he was admitted to Shandong Provincial First Normal School. He joined the Communist Youth League of China at the school and became a member of the Communist Party of China the same year. In 1925, the CPC Shandong Provincial Executive Committee sent him to Tai'an, to establish party organizations. Wang Zhongxiu and Yu Zanzhi were sent to Tai'an soon after. They recruited Qin Shaoxiang and Sun Jianlin as party members in Tai'an Railway Station.

In the spring of 1926, these five members had a meeting in a mountain, and established the CPC Tai'an Branch, which belonged to CPC Shandong Provincial Executive Committee. Ma was elected as the secretary,  while Yu, Wang and Qin became committee members. Ma went to Qufu the same year to publicize the CPC in the Temple of Confucius. During that summer, the CPC Branch of Shandong Provincial Second Normal School was set up, and Ma was elected to be in charge. Soon after, Ma left  and Gong Changfu took  this position.

In August, 1927, Wu Guanying, Li Henian and some other members established the CPC Tai'an County Committee under the CPC Shandong Province Committee. Ma served as the secretary. In 1929, he was arrested by Kuomintang and sentenced for 6 months in prison. After his release, he went to Shanghai, and the CPC Central Committee assigned him to Northeast China to preside over the work of the CPC Manchurian Provincial Committee. As soon as he arrived there, he rebuilt the Fushun underground party organization together with Yang Jingyu. It went through several disruptions. On August 30, 1929, both were arrested by Kenpeitai due to Fan Qing's report. In 1931, Ma was released. He exited the Communist Party. The next year, he went to study in Japan and took part in the Chinese Youth Party. After returning to China, he served as a lecturer at Peking Northeastern University. When the Second Sino-Japanese War occurred in 1937, Ma served under Cheng Qian. During the Anti-Rightist Campaign of the CPC in 1957, he was considered to be a rightist.

Death 
He died in 1977. In December 1979, Xiangtan Municipal Committee decided to rehabilitate and restore Ma's reputation.

References 

20th-century Chinese politicians
People from Tai'an
1908 births
1977 deaths